The following highways are numbered 634:

Canada

Spain
 N-634 road (Spain)

United States